Stéphan Bignet (born 29 June 1971) is an athlete from France.  He competes in triathlon.

Bignet competed at the first Olympic triathlon at the 2000 Summer Olympics.  He took thirty-first place with a total time of 1:51:12.15.

References

French male triathletes
Triathletes at the 2000 Summer Olympics
1971 births
Living people
Olympic triathletes of France
20th-century French people
21st-century French people